Giovanni Pietro Dal Toso PhD JCL (born 6 October 1964 in Vicenza, Italy) is an Italian Roman Catholic prelate who works in the diplomatic service of the Holy See.

Biography
After studying classics, he attended the major seminary of Brixen, completing his studies in philosophy and theology at the Higher Institute of Philosophy and Theology of Brixen, earning the title Magister Theologiae at the faculty of theology at the University of Innsbruck, Austria.

He was ordained a priest on 24 June 1989 for the Diocese of Bolzano-Brixen. After three years of ministry in the diocese, he studied philosophy at the Pontifical Gregorian University, receiving his doctorate in December 1997 with a thesis entitled: "The concept of proairesis in Gregory of Nyssa". In June 2001 he obtained a licentiate in canon law from the Pontifical Lateran University.

From 1 March 1996, he served as an official at the Secretary of the Pontifical Council "Cor unum". He was appointed Under-Secretary on 21 June 2004. He is a member of the Special Committee for dealing with cases of nullity of sacred ordination and release from obligations of the diaconate and priesthood established by the Congregation for Divine Worship and the Discipline of the Sacraments and then, when this compentence was moved, at the Congregation for the Clergy.

He was appointed as secretary of the Secretary of the Pontifical Council "Cor unum" by Pope Benedict XVI on 22 June 2010 until 1 January 2017, when Council was dissolved.  After the dissolution of the Pontifical Council in January 2017, he was appointed as secretary delegate of the newly erected Dicastery for Promoting Integral Human Development.  

In November 2017 he became Adjunct Secretary of the Congregation for the Evangelization of Peoples, succeeding Protase Rugambwa who moved up to Secretary. He was concurrently named titular archbishop of Foratiana and President of the Pontifical Mission Societies upon his appointment as Adjunct Secretary.

On 21 January 2023, Pope Francis appointed his as Apostolic Nuncio to Jordan. He will reside in Amman. This is the first time the nuncio will reside in Jordan.  On 17 February 2023, he was named as apostolic nuncio to Cyprus as well. 
 
Since September 2008 he has been a member of the Special Commission for dealing with cases of dissolution of marriage in favorem fidei of the Congregation for the Doctrine of the Faith.  He knows Italian, German, French, English and Spanish.

See also
 List of heads of the diplomatic missions of the Holy See

References

External links 

Living people
1964 births
20th-century Italian Roman Catholic priests
Pontifical Lateran University alumni
Pontifical Gregorian University alumni
Pontifical Council Cor Unum
People from Vicenza
Apostolic Nuncios to Jordan
21st-century Italian Roman Catholic priests